Durg–Raipur–Arang Expressway is a planned  long, six-lane, access-controlled greenfield expressway in the state of Chhattisgarh, India. The expressway is a part of Bharatmala Pariyojana, and will pass from Durg through Anjora, Patora, Supkona, Abhanpur and Naya Raipur before terminating at Arang.

Status updates
 Aug 2020: The target date for completion of proposed expressway is set as March 2024.
 Dec 2022 : Mehrotra Buildcon, and Shelke Constructions Led Joint Ventures Emerge As Lowest Bidders For the Expressway each with 46 km stretch Total 92 km

References

Expressways in Chhattisgarh
Proposed expressways in India
Transport in Durg